Tom Weston-Jones (born 29 June 1987) is an English actor, known for his role in Copper and for playing Richard Lee in Warrior (2019).

Early life and education
Weston-Jones was born in Burton-upon-Trent, Staffordshire, and was brought up in Dubai, having gone to school at Dubai College. He holds a degree in drama and theatre from Royal Holloway University of London, and has trained at the Bristol Old Vic Theatre School.

Career
Weston-Jones has had success on television.  He is best known for portraying Irish immigrant Detective Kevin Corcoran in the BBC America television series Copper. His other roles include Anthony in Not Safe for Work and Meriwether Compeyson in Dickensian.

Filmography

Television

Stage

See also

 List of British actors
 List of people from Dubai
 List of University of London people

References

Further reading
 Lash, Jolie (17 August 2012)."Q&A: Tom Weston-Jones Talks BBC America's Gritty New Show Copper".Access Hollywood (via omg!). Retrieved 22 February 2013.
 Harman, Justine (17 August [2012]). "Hot Topic: Tom Weston-Jones". Elle. Retrieved 22 February 2013.
 Radish, Christina (24 August 2012). "Copper's Tom Weston-Jones Comments on the Show's Physical Challenges, Dialogue, Accents, Moral Amgibuity of Characters and Collaborative Cast". Retrieved 22 February 2013.
 Rentilly, J. (16 August 2012). "Get Huge: The Old-School Way". Men's Health. Retrieved 22 February 2013.

External links
 

1987 births
20th-century births
20th-century English male actors
21st-century English male actors
Action choreographers

Alumni of Bristol Old Vic Theatre School
Alumni of the University of London
English expatriates in the United Arab Emirates
English male television actors
Living people
People from Burton upon Trent
People from Dubai